Chase Me was a Chinese reality show broadcast by Zhejiang Television. Chase Me was shot in the central business district of Ningbo, involving two teams competing in challenges at night hours. The show premiered from 8 November 2019 and abruptly ended on 22 November 2019.

On 27 November 2019, filming and broadcast were suspended following the sudden death of model-actor Godfrey Gao while filming its ninth episode; the fourth episode that was due to air two days later was not broadcast. On 5 December 2019, Zhejiang TV announced that Chase Me would be pulled from airing indefinitely, after three episodes of airing.

Cast (Chase Me team members) 
 Hua Shao (MC)
 William Chan (episodes 1-9)
 Huang Jingyu (episodes 1-9)
 Jam Hsiao (episodes 1-2)
 Fan Chengcheng (episodes 1-5)
 Zhong Chuxi (episodes 1-2)
 Song Zu'er (episodes 1-5)
 Wu Xuanyi (episodes 3-9)

Episodes 
Episode 1 (Airdate : 8 Nov 2019)
In the first episode, the team members competed against people who possess strong physical strength.

Episode 2 (Airdate : 15 Nov 2019)
In the second episode, Chase Me team members joined alongside previous Olympic medalists, then divided into Blue and Yellow teams to compete against each other.

Episode 3 (Airdate : 22 Nov 2019)
In the third episode, Chase Me team members faced off against the cast of Keep Running.

Episode 4 (Unaired)
In the end of Episode 3 it was announced that the guests in Episode 4 were UNINE and NEXT.

Episode 4 was originally due to be aired on 29 November 2019, but was cancelled (see below).

Cancellation
On 27 November, while filming the ninth episode in Ningbo, model-actor Godfrey Gao suddenly collapsed and was brought to the hospital, but was pronounced dead three hours after several resuscitation attempts. Gao died due to a sudden cardiac arrest, after over 17 hours of filming. Another celebrity on the same episode, Li Wenhan reported injuries due to a twisted ankle, and the producers decided to suspend the filming of the episode.

Following the death, the show faced criticisms in which contestants were involved in a number of high-risk challenges late at night. The lack of safety standards for reality programs in China was also highly scrutinised.

Zhejiang TV pulled the broadcast of episode four (which was initially scheduled to aired 29 November) and until today it has remained unaired. On 5 December, the show was finally announced cancelled after three episodes of air in the aftermath of Gao's death, and Zhejiang TV and the show's director shortly apologized on Sina Weibo and acknowledged the lapse of safety of the cast members involved in the program.

See also
 The Late, Late Breakfast Show – a British light entertainment show, which was also cancelled after a fatality as a result of a stunt gone wrong

References 

Zhejiang Television original programming
Chinese reality television series
2019 Chinese television series debuts
2019 Chinese television series endings